Moghavemat Tehran Football Club is an Iranian football club who are owned by the Basij and based in Tehran, Iran. They currently compete in the league 2.

The club is known for developing youth players which eventually are signed by clubs in the Persian Gulf Pro League.

Season-by-season

The table below shows the achievements of the club in various competitions.

See also
 2011-12 Hazfi Cup
 2011–12 Iran Football's 2nd Division

Football clubs in Tehran
Association football clubs established in 1995
1995 establishments in Iran